JEF may refer to:

JEF 
 Japan Economic Foundation, an NGO affiliated with Japan's Ministry of International Trade and Industry
 JEF United Chiba, a Japanese professional football club
 JEF, Amtrak station code for Jefferson City station in Missouri
 JEF, IATA airport code for Jefferson City Memorial Airport in Missouri
 Jeunes Européens Fédéralistes (Young European Federalists), international association for young advocates of European federation
 UK Joint Expeditionary Force, a framework for military forces drawn from the UK and up to eight northern European nations to deploy under British leadership

Jef 
 Jef, a Dutch-language masculine given name primarily found in Belgium
 "Jef", a Jacques Brel song on the album Ces Gens-Là, also sometimes called "Jef"
 Jef (fastfood restaurant), a fast-food chain on Okinawa Island